Ridhuan Barudin (born 23 March 1987) is a Singaporean football player. He plays currently for Tampines Rovers in the S.League. In 2011, he made an appearance in the Singapore national football team. And in 2019, he was recruited to train with the national team.

Club career

Tampines Rovers 
Ridhuan began his career with the Stags.

Tanjong Pagar United 
Ridhuan's next move was to Tanjong Pagar United. His performances with the Jaguars earned him a call-up to the national team.

Geylang United 
Following the conclusion of the 2011 S.League season, Geylang acted swiftly to sign Ridhuan to provide competition for veteran goalkeeper Yazid Yasin.

Back to Tampines Rovers 
Ridhuan moved back to Tampines after a year with Geylang and was also retained for the 2014 S.League season.

Hougang United 
Ridhuan first signed for the Cheetahs for the 2015 S.League season and established himself as the first choice goalkeeper after starving off challenges from Basil Chan and Ahmadulhaq Che Omar. Following his performances in 2015, he was subsequently handed a contract extension for the 2016 season. He was, however, dislodged by new signing Khairulhin Khalid at the start of the 2016 S.League season. After making over 40 appearances for the Cheetahs, he was retained by the club for the 2017 S.League season. It was announced in late December 2017 that Riduan will be staying at Hougang for a fourth consecutive season after agreeing to a contract extension.

In 2022, Ridhuan was ruled out midway of the 2022 Singapore Premier League due to medical reasons.

Career statistics 
As of 27 Feb 2022

International career 
Ridhuan received his first international call-up in August 2011 for a friendly match against Thailand and two World Cup qualifying matches against China and Iraq.

References 

1987 births
Living people
Singaporean footballers
Singapore Premier League players
Association football goalkeepers
Tampines Rovers FC players
Tanjong Pagar United FC players
Geylang International FC players